STS-51-I was the 20th mission of NASA's Space Shuttle program and the sixth flight of Space Shuttle Discovery. During the mission, Discovery deployed three communications satellites into orbit. The mission launched from Kennedy Space Center, Florida, on August 27, 1985, and landed at Edwards Air Force Base, California, on September 3, 1985.

Crew

Spacewalks 
  Fisher and van Hoften  – EVA 1
 EVA 1 Start: August 31, 1985
 EVA 1 End: August 31, 1985
 Duration: 7 hours, 20 minutes

  Fisher and van Hoften  – EVA 2
 EVA 2 Start: September 1, 1985
 EVA 2 End: September 1, 1985
 Duration: 4 hours, 26 minutes

Crew seating arrangements

Launch

Mission summary 
Discovery launched at 6:58 a.m. EDT on August 27, 1985. Two earlier launch attempts, one on August 24 and another on August 25, were scrubbed – the first because of poor weather, and the second because the backup orbiter computer failed and had to be replaced. The successful launch on August 27, 1985, took place just as an approaching storm front reached the launch pad area.

The five-man STS-51-I crew included Joe H. Engle, commander; Richard O. Covey, pilot; and James D. A. van Hoften, John M. Lounge, and William F. Fisher, mission specialists. Their primary mission was to deploy three commercial communications satellites and retrieve and repair the Syncom IV-3 (Leasat-3) satellite, which had been deployed during the STS-51-D mission in April 1985, but had malfunctioned. In addition, a mid-deck materials processing experiment, the Physical Vapor Transport Organic Solid Experiment (PVTOS), was flown aboard Discovery.

The three communications satellites were Aussat-1, a multi-purpose spacecraft owned by Australia; ASC-1, owned and operated by the American Satellite Corporation (ASC); and Syncom IV-4 (Leasat-4), leased to the Department of Defense (DoD) by its builder, Hughes Space and Communications. Both Aussat-1 and ASC-1 were deployed on the day of the launch, August 27, 1985. Syncom IV-4 (Leasat-4) was deployed two days later. All three achieved their planned geosynchronous orbits and became operational.

On the fifth day of the mission, astronauts Fisher and van Hoften began repair efforts on the malfunctioning Syncom IV-3, following a successful rendezvous maneuver by Discovery. The effort was slowed by a problem with the Remote Manipulator System (Canadarm) elbow joint. After a second EVA by Fisher and van Hoften, the satellite's control lever was repaired, permitting commands from the ground to activate the spacecraft's systems and eventually send it into its proper geosynchronous orbit. The two EVAs lasted a total of 11 hours and 46 minutes.

Discovery landed on Runway 23 at Edwards Air Force Base at 6:16 a.m. PDT on September 3, 1985. The flight lasted a total of 7 days, 2 hours, 18 minutes and 42 seconds, during which the shuttle completed 112 orbits of the Earth.

Mission insignia  
The insignia depicts an American bald eagle, trailing red and white stripes, and pushing a boundary layer forward. The 19 stars, along with the eagle, are references to the 20th shuttle mission (with the eagle representing the orbiter and thus being the 20th "star"). Lining the patch are the surnames of the crew members.

Wake-up calls 
NASA began a tradition of playing music to astronauts during the Project Gemini, and first used music to wake up a flight crew during Apollo 15. Each track is specially chosen, often by the astronauts' families, and usually has a special meaning to an individual member of the crew, or is applicable to their daily activities.

Gallery

See also 

 List of human spaceflights
 List of Space Shuttle missions

References

External links 
 NASA mission summary 
 STS-51I Video Highlights 

Space Shuttle missions
Edwards Air Force Base
1985 in spaceflight
1985 in the United States
Spacecraft launched in 1985
Spacecraft which reentered in 1985
Satellite servicing missions